John Peter Hooten (born November 29, 1950) is an American actor. He is best known for playing the title character in the television film Dr. Strange (1978).

Career
Hooten started acting in 1968 at the age of 17. He appeared as an uncredited extra in Midnight Cowboy. He attended Ithaca College in upstate New York. His first speaking role was a 1969 appearance on the TV drama Marcus Welby, M.D.. Later, he played the title character in the 1978 TV film Dr. Strange and appeared as a guest star in The Waltons, Mod Squad and Mannix.

TV and filmography

Personal life
Hooten and the poet James Merrill were romantic partners from 1983 until the death of the latter in 1995. After 16 years in New York City, and some time in Connecticut, Hooten moved to St. Augustine, Florida. As of 2009, Hooten has lived in Sarasota, Florida.

References

External links
 

1950 births
Living people
American male film actors
American male television actors
20th-century American male actors
21st-century American male actors
Male actors from Florida
People from Clermont, Florida
Ithaca College alumni